

Events

 Publisher Blatant Comics founded by Chris Crosby and Bobby Crosby.
 WildStorm established the Cliffhanger imprint.

January 

 January 8: In Italy, the first issue of Fantacomix day (Eura editoriale), a magazine specialized in Argentine sci-fi comics; it lasts for four issues.
 January 22: In Topolino the Mickey Mouse story Chief Casey's Longest Night, by Tito Faraci and Giorgio Cavazzano is published, which marks the debut of Brick Boulder.
 Specific date in January unknown: Peter van Straaten wins his second Inktspotprijs for Best Political Cartoon. 
 In Shadis magazine, the first strip of Dork Tower, by John Kovalic.
 In The incredible Hulk 449 (Marvel Comics), the Thunderbolts make their debut.
 Due, by Alessandro Sisti, Corrado Mastrantuono and Paolo Mottura (Walt Disney Italia). Two central figures of PKNA, the evil computer Due and the mysterious scientist and businessman Everett Ducklair, make their debut. In the year, the series’ supporting cast is enriched by several other recurring characters, such as the android Odin Eidolon and the secret agent Mary Ann Flagstar.

March
 March 20: first strip of Liberty meadows, by Frank Cho.
 March 22: The final episode of Steve Dowling's Garth is published.
 The final episode of Daniel Clowes' Ghost World is prepublished in Eightball. In the same issue Clowes publishes his essay Modern Cartoonist.
 In Italy, La lunga notte dell’investigatore Merlo (Detective Merlo’s long night), by Leo Ortolani (Edizioni Bande Dessinée), parody of the Humphrey Bogart’s movies.

April
 April 1: Tony Barbieri and Bill Wray's Monroe makes its debut in the 356th issue of Mad. It will run until 2010, albeit with a different artist from 2006 on: Tom Fowler.
 April 3: first issue of Knuckles the dark legion (later Knuckles the Echidna) by Ken Penders. 
 Comic strip Cigarman begins publication in Smoke Magazine
 Marvel cancels The Punisher (1995 series) with issue #18
 A history of violence by John Wagner and Vince Locke (Paradox press).
 First issue of the annual magazine Il grande Diabolik (Astorina).
 First issue of Rat-Man collection (Panini comics); the Leo Ortolani’s character, till then appeared only in self-published albums, gets the general public.

May
 May 24: The British girls' magazine Mandy and Judy, who merged in 1991, now merge with Bunty. It will run in this form until 2001.
 First issue of 2020 Visions by Jamie Delano (Vertigo).
 In Cable 45, the crossover Operation: Zero tolerance begins.
 Sergio Bonelli editore launches two new magazines: the semi-annual Agenzia alfa (spin-off of Nathan Never) and the annual I grandi comici del fumetto (The great authors of humoristic comics), inaugurated by Cocco Bill Diquaedilà, one of the last Benito Jacovitti’s work.

June 

 June 15: Un copieur sachant copier !, by Zidrou and Godi, first album of the series L’éleve Ducobu.
 First issue of Hellboy: wake the devil, by Mike Mignola (Dark Horse).
 Fiftieth anniversary of Scrooge McDuck's first appearance. The event is celebrated by two stories: Secret of the Incas, by Byron Erickson and Giorgio Cavazzano (June 24, Topolino) and A little something special, by Don Rosa (June 26, Anders and Co.). 
 Fort Ghost, first album of the western-fantasy series Magico Vento, by Gianfranco Manfredi (Sergio Bonelli editore). 
 L’heure du tigre by Jean Van Hamme and Philippe Francq (Dupuis)

July
 July 7: Jerry Scott and Jim Borgman's Zits makes its debut.
July 15: In Topolino the story Paperino e la macchina della conoscenza, by Corrado Mastantuono is published, which marks the debut of Bum-Bum Ghigno. 
 July 31: The Belgian city Middelkerke starts an annual project where statues of famous Belgian comics characters are placed at the dijk during the summer. The first one to be honoured this way is Jommeke.
 Marvel Comics' Flashback month: all issues were released with the number −1.
 On 200 newspapers, the first strip of Zits, by Jerry Scott and Jim Brogman, appear.

August 

 First issue of Major Bummer, by John Arcudi and Doug Mahnke (DC comics).
 OK Corral by Morris, Éric Adam and Xavier Fauche.

September 

 September 12 : L’occhio di vetro (The glass eye) by Carlo Ambrosini, first album of the mystery-fantasy series Napoleone (Sergio Bonelli).
 First issue of the second Marvel Team-up series.
 First issue of  Transmetropolitan by Waren Ellis and Frank Robertson (Vertigo).
 Le jugement, by William Vance and Jean Van Hamme (Dargaud)

October

 October 10: in Anders and & co., W.H.A.D.A.L.O.T.T.A.J.A.R.G.O.N. by Don Rosa reveals how Huey, Dewey and Louie joined the Junior Woodchunks
 October 11–12: During the Stripdagen in Haarlem, the Netherlands, Peter Pontiac receives the Stripschapprijs. Sunnya van der Vegt en René van Royen receive the P. Hans Frankfurtherprijs for their book Asterix en de waarheid, about the historicity in Astérix.
 Family Values by Frank Miller (Dark Horse).
 First issue of Ascension, by David Finch and Matt Banning (Top Cow) 
 The last complete story of Zanardi (untitled, but known as “Zanardi in the Middle Ages”) by Andrea Pazienza, appear in the italian magazine Comic Art..
 The giant album Gli uomini in nero (The man in black) by Alfredo Castelli and Esposito Bros is published by Sergio Bonelli. It tells the whole story of the Martin Mystere universe, from the fall of Atlantis to the present.

November
 November 29: Willy Vandersteen's, old villa in Kalmthout, Belgium, becomes an interactive children's museum.
 Mayo Kaan takes out newspaper ads claiming to be the original model for Superman, although his allegations were later proven false.
 La cage by Jean Van Hamme and Grzegorz Rosiński (Le Lombard) 
 Ombres sur Tombstone by Jean Giraud (Dargaud).
 La Pourpre et l'Or by Jean Dufaux and Philippe Delaby (Dargaud), first album of the Murena series.

December
 The final issue of the Belgian comics magazine À Suivre is published.
Marvel returns the Avengers and Fantastic Four to their main continuity in Heroes Reborn: The Return #1–4
Bad boy by Frank Miller and Simon Bisley (ONI press)

Specific date unknown
 The final album of the Belgian comics series Bessy, originally created by Willy Vandersteen, is published. 
 The final episode of the Belgian comics series Tif et Tondu is published, ending it just a year before its 60th birthday.
 The Day I Swapped My Dad for Two Goldfish by Neil Gaiman and David McKean (White Wolf)
 In Norway, first strip of Den swarte siden (later, Nemi) by Lise Myhre.
 In Italy, number 0 of the series No Name by Davide Barzi and Oskar (Edipierre), parody of the super-heroes comics.

Births

Deaths

January 
 January 5: 
 André Franquin, Belgian comics artist (Gaston Lagaffe, Marsupilami, Modeste et Pompon, Idées Noires, continued Spirou and Fantasio), dies at age 73.
 Frans Piët, Dutch comics artist (Sjors en Sjimmie), dies at age 91.
 January 6: Pétur Bjarnason, Icelandic-Swedish comic artist (Drottning Drusila later retitled Regina), passes away at age 50.
 January 8: Normand Hudon, Canadian animator and comics artist (Julien Gagnon), dies at age 67.
 January 25: Dan Barry, American cartoonist and comics artist (Marvel Comics, continued Tarzan, Flash Gordon), dies at age 73.

February
 February 3: Geoffrey Foladori, Uruguayan comics artist (El Professor Pistacho, Pelopincho y Cachirula, Don Gumersindo, Don Tranquilo y Flia), dies at age 88.
 February 7: Nina Albright, American comics artist (Comandette, continued Miss Victory), dies at age 89.
 February 13: Hans Schlensker (Biff Baker, assisted on Buz Sawyer), dies at age 82.
 February 15: Jack Sparling, Canadian-American comics artist (Claire Voyant, Hap Hopper, Washington Correspondent), dies at age 81.
 February 23: Larry Antonette, aka Dean Carr, American comics artist (Dash Dixon, Bozo and the Baron, Calling the Duke), dies at age 87.
 Specific date unknown: Arthur Horner, Australian-British cartoonist (Colonel Pewter, The Thoughts of Citizen Doe), dies at age 80.

March
 March 10: Stan Drake, American comics artist (The Heart of Juliet Jones), dies at age 75.

April
 April 4: Billy Graham, American comics artist (worked on Luke Cage, Black Panther), dies at age 61.
 April 11: Helge Kühn-Nielsen, Danish comics artist, teacher, painter and illustrator, dies at age 76.
 April 16: Roland Topor, French novelist, illustrator, cartoonist, comics artist, film script writer, TV script writer, animator and playwright (Hara-Kiri), dies at the age of 59.
 April 27: Víctor Arriazu, Spanish comics artist (assisted on El Jabato), dies at age 61 or 62.

May
 May 1: Sirius, Belgian comics artist (Timour), dies at the age of 86.
 May 4: Lou Stathis, American comics editor of DC's Vertigo line, dies of complications related to a brain tumor at age 44.
 May 31: Ruth Atkinson, Canadian-American comics artist (Patsy Walker, Millie the Model), dies at age 78.

June
 June 6: Manny Stallman, American comics artist (various horror comics), dies at age 70.
 June 12: Rémy Bourles, French comics artist (Bob Mallard), passes away at age 91.
 June 15: Kim Casali, New Zealand cartoonist and comics artist (Love Is...), dies of bone and liver cancer at the age of 55.

July 
 July 6: Michele Pepe, Italian comic artist (Fury, Gli Eroi del Mare, worked on Zagor, Martin Mystère), dies at age 50.
 July 8: Clay Geerdes, American writer and photojournalist who extensively covered the underground comix movement (founded Comix World newsletter), dies of liver cancer at age 63.

August
 August 19: James Ringrose, Dutch comics artist (Tekko Taks, Blix Kater, Willie en Wop), dies at age 83.

September
 September 4: Nasjah Djamin, Indonesian illustrator and comics artist (drew a comic book about Hang Tuah), dies at age 72.
 September 15: Lode Pemmelaar, Dutch painter and comics artist (Romila the Velvet Girl), dies at age 54.
 September 25: Josep Toutain, Spanish comics artist and publisher (founder of Selecciones Ilustradas and Toutain-Editor), dies from lung cancer at age 64–65.

October 
 October 8: Zhang Chongren, Chinese artist and sculptor (inspiration for the Tintin character Chang Chong-Chen), passes away at age 91.
 October 16: Dick Cavalli, American comics artist and cartoonist (Winthrop, continued Norbert), dies at the age of 74.
 October 18: Milt Neil, American animator and comics artist (the Howdy Doody comic strip), passes away at age 83.
 October 22: Per Lygum, Danish animator and comics artist (Planckton), dies at age 64.
 October 30: Nikola Mitrovic, AKA Kokan, Serbian comic artist, dies at age 73.

November 
 November 9: Leonard Matthews, British comics artist (Dafffy the Cowboy Tec) and publisher, dies at age 83.
 November 13: Samm Schwartz, American comics artist (Jughead) stories for Archie Comics, passes away at age 75.
 November: Evelyn Flinders, British comics artist (The Silent Three), passes away at age 97.

December 
 December 3: Benito Jacovitti, Italian comics artist (Cocco Bill, Zorry Kid), dies at the age of 74.
 December 8: Walter Molino, Italian illustrator and comics artist (Virus, Il Mago della Foresta Morta, Captain l'Audace, continued Kit Carson), dies at age 82.
 December 11: Heinz Schubel, German illustrator and comics artist (Lurchi), dies at age 91.
 December 13: Samm Schwartz, American comics artist (continued Archie Comics), dies at age 77.

Specific date unknown
 Carol Carlson, American comics artist (The Adventures of Waddles), dies at age 84 or 85.
 Dennis Ellefson, American comics artist, dies at age 59 or 60.
 Kerstin Frykstrand, Swedish illustrator and comics artist (Muff och Tuff), dies at age 95 or 96.
 Frank Little, American animator and comics artist (worked for Jerry Iger's  studio), dies at age 90.
 Armand Panis, aka Sinap, Belgian comics artist, caricaturist and cartoonist (Klopstok), dies at age 89 or 90.
 Jorge Pérez Del Castillo, Chilean-Argentine comics artist, dies at age 73 or 74.
 Roex, aka Roger Exelmans, Belgian comics artist (continued Rikske en Fikske), dies at age 60.
 Bernard Segal, aka "Seeg", American painter and comics artist (Honey and Hank, also known as Elsworth), dies at age 78 or 79.
 George Smits, aka 'Toet', Belgian painter, experimental musician and comics artist (De avonturen van Jan, member of Ercola), dies at age 52 or 53.
 Tony Velasquez, Filipino comics artist (Kenkoy), dies at age 86.
 Roland Venet, aka Rol, French comics artist (Wa-Pi-Ti), dies at age 77 or 78.

Conventions
 January 23–26: Angoulême International Comics Festival (Angoulême, France)
 February 2: Alternative Press Expo (San Jose, California)
 March: Big Apple Comic Con (Church of St. Paul the Apostle, New York City)
 March 15–16: UKCAC (Institute of Education, London, England) — guests include Joe Kubert and Dan Clowes; presentation of the inaugural National Comics Awards by Paul Gambaccini and Jonathan Ross
  March 15–16: MegaCon (Orange County Convention Center, Orlando, Florida): guests include J. Michael Straczynski and Peter David
 March 21–23: Motor City Comic Con I (Novi Expo Center, Novi, Michigan)
 April: Northampton Comic Convention (Northampton, Massachusetts)
 April 18–20: Pittsburgh Comicon (Monroeville ExpoMart, Monroeville, Pennsylvania) — guests include David Prowse and Carmen Electra
 April 25–27: WonderCon (Oakland, California)
 Summer: "EuroCAPTION" (Oxford Union Society, Oxford, England) — guests include France's David B, Spain's Max, and the Netherlands' Maaike Hartjes
 Summer: Canadian National Comic Book Exposition (Metro Toronto Convention Centre, Toronto, Ontario, Canada) — c. 3,800 attendees; guests include Marc Silvestri, Dwayne Turner, Carlos Pacheco, Dale Keown, David Wohl, and Rich Buckler
 June 12–15: Heroes Convention (Charlotte Convention Center, Charlotte, North Carolina)
 June 26–29: Dragon Con (Inforum Convention Center/Westin Peachtree Plaza/Atlanta Civic Center, Atlanta, Georgia) — 18,000 attendees
 July 4–6: Chicago Comicon (Rosemont Convention Center, Rosemont, Illinois) — c. 5,000 attendees; convention sold to Wizard Entertainment
 July 17–20: Comic-Con International (San Diego Convention Center, San Diego, California) — 40,000 attendees; special guests include Brent Anderson, Dick Ayers, Steve Bissette, Terry Brooks, Kurt Busiek, Evan Dorkin, Sarah Dyer, Steven Hughes, Peter Kuper, David Lapham, Carol Lay, Joseph Michael Linsner, Ralph McQuarrie, Linda Medley, Michael Moorcock, George Pérez, Brian Pulido, Alex Ross, R.A. Salvatore, Kevin Smith, George Tuska, Jhonen Vasquez, Paul Verhoeven, Mark Waid, and Al Williamson
 September 19–21: Small Press Expo (Silver Spring, Maryland)* 1997: September 19–21 — Quality Hotel, Silver Spring, Maryland
 October–November: FIBDA (Amadora, Portugal) — eighth annual edition; special guests include Jean-Claude Mézières Pierre Christin, François Schuiten, Benoît Peeters, Enki Bilal, André Juillard, Ted Benoît, Jean Van Hamme, Theo van den Boogaard, Kevin O'Neill, and Miguelanxo Prado
 October 11–12: Motor City Comic Con II (Dearborn Civic Center, Dearborn, Michigan)
 November 29–30: Mid-Ohio Con (Adam's Mark Hotel, Columbus, Ohio) — guests include  John Byrne, Roger Stern, Kurt Busiek, Brent Anderson, Sergio Aragonés, Mark Evanier, Mart Nodell, Tony Isabella, Joseph Michael Linsner, Sheldon Moldoff, Terry Moore, Steve Lieber, Jim Ottaviani, Paul Smith, Alvin Schwartz, Murphy Anderson, and Bernie Wrightson

Exhibitions 
 September 18–December 24: "Art and Provocation: Images from Rebels" (Boulder Museum of Contemporary Art, Boulder, Colorado) — group exhibition focusing on Robert Crumb and Philip Guston, along with other artists, including Sue Coe, Georganne Deen, Debbie Drechsler, Glenn Head, and Amy Sillman

First issues by title
Clover
Release: by Kodansha (Amie). Authors: Clamp

Desert Punk
Release: August 5 by Enterbrain (Comic Beam). Author: Usune Masatoshi

Peach Girl
Release: by Kodansha  (Bessatsu Friend). Author: Miwa Ueda

DC Comics
Jack Kirby's Fourth World by John Byrne

Young Heroes in Love

The Flintstones and The Jetsons

Transmetropolitan

JLA: Year One by Mark Waid and Barry Kitson. 12-issue maxi-series

References